Hadab al-Fawwar (lit. Sparkling Slope) is a Palestinian village located seven kilometers southwest of Hebron. The village is in the Hebron Governorate Southern West Bank. According to the Palestinian Central Bureau of Statistics, the village had a population of 1,918 in 2007. The primary health care facilities for the village are designated by the Ministry of Health as level 2.

History
Ceramics from the Byzantine era have been found here.

Ottoman era
In 1883  the PEF's Survey of Western Palestine (SWP) found here "Walls, a deep cistern, and a large tomb, sequently used as a stable."

Footnotes

Bibliography

External links
Survey of Western Palestine, Map 21:    IAA, Wikimedia commons
 Hadab Al Fawwar Village (fact sheet), Applied Research Institute–Jerusalem (ARIJ) 
 Hadab Al Fawwar Village profile, ARIJ
 Hadab Al Fawwar Village aerial photo, ARIJ
 The priorities and needs for development in Hadab al Fawwar village based on the community and local authorities' assessment, ARIJ

Villages in the West Bank
Hebron Governorate
Municipalities of the State of Palestine